KZMQ-FM (100.3 FM) is a radio station broadcasting a country music format. Licensed to Greybull, Wyoming, United States, the station is currently owned by the Big Horn Radio Network, a division of Legend Communications of Wyoming, LLC. It features programming from Westwood One.

All five stations of the Big Horn Radio Network have their offices and studios located on Mountain View Drive in Cody. The KZMQ-FM transmitter site is on a mountain near US Highway 14A, east of Lovell, WY.

References

External links

ZMQ-FM
Country radio stations in the United States
Big Horn County, Wyoming